The 2020 FC Irtysh Pavlodar season was the 29th successive season that the club will play in the Kazakhstan Premier League, the highest tier of association football in Kazakhstan.

Season events
On 13 March, the Football Federation of Kazakhstan announced all league fixtures would be played behind closed doors for the foreseeable future due to the COVID-19 pandemic. On 16 March the Football Federation of Kazakhstan suspended all football until 15 April.

On 30 May, the Professional Football League of Kazakhstan announced that Irtysh Pavlodar had withdrawn from the league due to financial issues, with all their matches being excluded from the league results.

Squad

Transfers

In

Released

Competitions

Premier League

Results summary

Results by round

Results

League table

Kazakhstan Cup

Squad statistics

Appearances and goals

|-
|colspan="14"|Players away from Irtysh Pavlodar on loan:
|-
|colspan="14"|Players who left Irtysh Pavlodar during the season:

|}

Goal scorers

Disciplinary record

References

External links
Official Website

FC Irtysh Pavlodar seasons
Irtysh Pavlodar